Samvatsara (संवत्सर) is a Sanskrit term for a "year" in Vedic literature such as the Rigveda and other ancient texts. In the medieval era literature, a samvatsara refers to the "Jovian year", that is a year based on the relative position of the planet Jupiter, while the solar year is called varsha. A jovian year is not equal to a solar year based on the relative position of Earth and Sun. 

A samvatsara is defined in Indian calendars as the time Brihaspati (Jupiter) takes to transit from one sign of the Hindu zodiac (i.e. rashi) to the next relative to its mean motion. The ancient text Surya Siddhanta calculates a samvatsara to be about 361 days, marginally short of a solar year. Hence, one complete orbit of Jupiter through all the twelve signs of the zodiac will approximately equal twelve solar years. Five such orbits of Jupiter (i.e. 12 times 5 = 60 samvatsara) are referred to as a samvatsara chakra. Each samvatsara within this cycle has been given a name. Once all 60 samvatsara are over, the cycle starts over again.

This cycle of 60 samvatsara is based on the relative positions of Jupiter and Saturn in the sky. The orbital periods of Jupiter and Saturn are approximately 12 and 30 solar years respectively. The least common multiple of these two orbital periods is ~60 solar years. Every sixty years, both planets will be positioned at nearly the same sidereal coordinates where they started off sixty years before, thus forming a sixty year cycle.

Omitted Samvatsaras 
The ancient text Surya Siddhanta calculates the Jovian year to be about 361.026721 days or about 4.232 days shorter than the Earth-based solar year. This difference requires that about once every 85 solars years (~ 86 jovian years), one of the named samvatsara is expunged (skipped as a shadow year), to synchronize the two calendars. 

This system of omission has fallen into disuse in South India. "There is evidence to show that the cycle of Jupiter was in use in Southern India before Saka 828 (A.D. 905-6); but from that year, according to the Arya Siddhanta, or from Saka 831 (A.D. 908-9) according to the Sürya-Siddhanta, the expunction of the samvatsaras was altogether neglected, with the result that the 60-year cycle in the south became luni-solar from that year."

List of Samvatsaras 
The sixty Samvatsaras are divided into 3 groups of 20 Samvatsaras each. The first 20 from Prabhava to Vyaya are assigned to Brahma. The next 20 from Sarvajit to Parabhava to Vishnu and the last 20 to Shiva.

See also
Hindu Calendar
Panchangam
the Chinese sexagenary cycle

References

Sources

Units of time